Carlos Enrique José Pellegrini Bevans (October 11, 1846 – July 17, 1906) was Vice President of Argentina and became President of Argentina from August 6, 1890 to October 12, 1892, upon Miguel Ángel Juárez Celman's resignation (see Revolución del Parque).

President of Argentina

During his administration, he cleaned up the finances and created the Banco de la Nación Argentina, Argentina's national bank, and the prestigious high-school that carries his name, Escuela Superior de Comercio Carlos Pellegrini, public school of noted academic level, part of Universidad de Buenos Aires. 

After the end of his term, he served as senator between 1895 and 1903, and in 1906, he was elected National Representative in the lower house.

His life

Pellegrini was the son of Swiss-Italian engineer Charles Henri Pellegrini (born in Chambéry) and María Bevans Bright, and grandson of English engineer James "Santiago" Bevans.

Like many other nineteenth century Argentines prominent in public life, he was a Freemason. He died in his native city of Buenos Aires and is buried in La Recoleta Cemetery.

References

External links 

1846 births
1906 deaths
People from Buenos Aires
National Autonomist Party politicians
Vice presidents of Argentina
Presidents of Argentina
Argentine Freemasons
19th-century Argentine lawyers
Argentine people of Swiss-Italian descent
Argentine people of English descent
University of Buenos Aires alumni
Burials at La Recoleta Cemetery
Patrician families of Buenos Aires